John Strutt Lauder (1829–1900) was Dean of Ottawa from 1897 until his death.

Lauder was educated at Trinity College, Toronto and ordained in 1854. After a curacy at St. Catharines he held incumbencies at Carleton Place and Merrickville. In 1856 he married Henrietta Lyon of Richmond, Ontario. He was Archdeacon of Ottawa from 1874 to 1897.

Notes

University of Toronto alumni
Archdeacons of Ottawa
Deans of Ottawa
19th-century Canadian Anglican priests
1829 births
1900 deaths